1897 in sports describes the year's events in world sport.

American football
College championship
 College football national championship – Penn Quakers
Professional championships
 Western Pennsylvania champions – Greensburg Athletic Association

Association football
England
 The Football League – Aston Villa 47 points, Sheffield United 36, Derby County 36, Preston North End 34, Liverpool 33, Sheffield Wednesday 31
 FA Cup final – Aston Villa 3–2 Everton at Crystal Palace, London.
 Aston Villa becomes the second club to complete The Double in English football
Scotland
 Scottish Football League – Hearts
 Scottish Cup – Rangers 5–1 Dumbarton at Hampden Park

Athletics
John J. McDermott wins the first running of the Boston Marathon, then known as the B.A.A. Road Race
USA Outdoor Track and Field Championships

Australian rules football
VFL Premiership
 Formation of Victorian Football League (now Australian Football League) with initial clubs being Carlton, Collingwood, Essendon, Fitzroy, Geelong, Melbourne, St Kilda and South Melbourne
 Essendon wins the 1st VFL Premiership (under the finals system used this year only, no Grand Final is played)

Baseball
National championship
 Boston Beaneaters wins the National League championship 
Events
 Temple Cup – Baltimore Orioles 4–1 Boston Beaneaters

Boxing
Events
 17 March — Bob Fitzsimmons knocks out James J. Corbett in the 14th round to win the World Heavyweight Championship in the first championship fight ever captured on film.
Lineal world champions
 World Heavyweight Championship – James J. Corbett → Bob Fitzsimmons
 World Middleweight Championship – title vacant
 World Welterweight Championship – Tommy Ryan
 World Lightweight Championship – George "Kid" Lavigne
 World Featherweight Championship – George Dixon → Solly Smith
 World Bantamweight Championship – Jimmy Barry

Cricket
Events
 Two English teams toured the West Indies under A A Priestley and Lord Hawke
 A Philadelphian team tours England
England
 County Championship – Lancashire
 Minor Counties Championship – Worcestershire
 Most runs – Bobby Abel 2099 @ 44.65 (HS 250)
 Most wickets – Tom Richardson 273 @ 14.45 (BB 8–49)
 Wisden Five Cricketers of the Year – Frederick Bull, Willis Cuttell, Frank Druce, Gilbert Jessop, Jack Mason
Australia
 Sheffield Shield – New South Wales
 Most runs – Jack Lyons 404 @ 57.71 (HS 113)
 Most wickets – Tom McKibbin 44 @ 14.88 (BB 8–74)
India
 Bombay Presidency – Europeans
South Africa
 Currie Cup – Western Province
West Indies
 Inter-Colonial Tournament – Barbados

Figure skating
World Figure Skating Championships
 World Men's Champion – Gustav Hügel (Austria)

Golf
Major tournaments
 British Open – Harold Hilton
 U.S. Open – Joe Lloyd
Other tournaments
 British Amateur – Jack Allan
 US Amateur – H. J. Whigham

Horse racing
England
 Grand National – Manifesto
 1,000 Guineas Stakes – Chelandry
 2,000 Guineas Stakes – Galtee More
 The Derby – Galtee More
 The Oaks – Limasol
 St. Leger Stakes – Galtee More
Australia
 Melbourne Cup – Gaulus 
Canada
 Queen's Plate – Ferdinand
Ireland
 Irish Grand National – Breemount's Pride
 Irish Derby Stakes – Wales
USA
 Kentucky Derby – Typhoon II
 Preakness Stakes – Paul Kauvar
 Belmont Stakes – Scottish Chieftain

Ice hockey
Stanley Cup
 Montreal Victorias win a 3rd Stanley Cup, defeating Ottawa.

Motor racing
Nice Speed Week
 The first regular motor racing venue is Nice, France, where an annual "Speed Week" is established.  To fill out the schedule, most types of racing event are invented here including the first hill climb, from Nice to La Turbie, and a sprint that has been called the forerunner of drag racing.

Rowing
The Boat Race
 3 April — Oxford wins the 54th Oxford and Cambridge Boat Race

Rugby league
England
 Championship – not contested
 Challenge Cup final – Batley 10–3 St. Helens at Headingley Rugby Stadium, Leeds. This is the inaugural competition.
 Lancashire League Championship – Broughton Rangers
 Yorkshire League Championship – Brighouse Rovers

Rugby union
Home Nations Championship
 15th Home Nations Championship series is not completed

Speed skating
Speed Skating World Championships
 Men's All-round Champion – Jack McCulloch (Canada)

Tennis
Events
 The inaugural French women's singles championship is held.
England
 Wimbledon Men's Singles Championship – Reginald Doherty (GB) defeats Harold Mahony (Ireland) 6–4 6–4 6–3
 Wimbledon Women's Singles Championship – Blanche Bingley Hillyard (GB) defeats Charlotte Cooper Sterry (GB) 5–7 7–5 6–2
France
 French Men's Singles Championship – Paul Aymé defeats Francky Wardan (GB) 4–6 6–4 6–2
 French Women's Singles Championship – Françoise Masson (France) defeats P. Girod (France) 6–3 6–1
USA
 American Men's Singles Championship – Robert Wrenn (USA) defeats Wilberforce Eaves (GB) 4–6 8–6 6–3 2–6 6–2
 American Women's Singles Championship – Juliette Atkinson (USA) defeats Elisabeth Moore (USA) 6–3 6–3 4–6 3–6 6–3

References

 
Sports by year